Indian cavalry is the name collectively given to the Midwest and Eastern American Indians who fought during the American Civil War, most of them on horseback and for the Confederate States of America.

Indian units in the CS Armed forces

Cherokee Nation

 1st Cherokee Mounted Rifles – Col. (later Brigadier) Stand Watie, Col. John Drew
 Thomas' Legion / 69th North Carolina Infantry – Col. William H. Thomas
 Scales'/Fry's Battalion of Cherokee Cavalry
 Meyer's Battalion of Cherokee Cavalry
 Cherokee Battalion of Infantry
 2nd Cherokee Artillery Battery
 Livingston's Cherokee Spikes

Chickasaw Nation
 1st Regiment of Chickasaw Infantry
 1st Regiment of Chickasaw Cavalry – Col. William L. Hunter
 1st Battalion, Chickasaw Cavalry (Shecoe's Btln., Chickasaw  Mounted Volunteers) – Lt. Col. Joseph D. Harris, Lt. Col. Lemuel M. Reynolds, Lt. Col. Martin Shecoe

Choctaw Nation
 1st Regiment Choctaw & Chickasaw Mounted Rifles – Col. (later Brigadier) Douglas H. Cooper
 1st Regiment of Choctaw Mounted Rifles
 2nd Regiment of Choctaw Cavalry
 3rd Regiment of Choctaw Cavalry
 Deneale's Regiment of Choctaw Warriors
 Folsom's Battalion of Choctaw Mounted Rifles
 Wilkins' Company of Choctaw Infantry – Cpt. John Wilkins

Creek Nation
 1st Creek Mounted Rifles – Col. Daniel N. McIntosh
 2nd Creek Mounted Rifles – Lt. Col. Chilly McIntosh

Seminole Nation
 1st Battalion Seminole Mounted Volunteers
 2nd Regiment Seminole Mounted Volunteers

Others
 Osage Cavalry Battalion – Maj. Broken Arm

Indian units in the US Armed forces

Indian Home Guard
 1st Regiment, Indian Home Guard
 2nd Regiment, Indian Home Guard – Col. John Ritchie
 3rd Regiment, Indian Home Guard – Col. William A. Phillips
 4th Regiment, Indian Home Guard

See also

 Native Americans in the American Civil War
 Indian Territory in the American Civil War
 Confederate units of Indian Territory
 Confederate Government units – Indian cavalry

References

External links
 Oklahoma Digital Maps: Digital Collections of Oklahoma and Indian Territory

Military history of the Confederate States of America
19th century Cherokee history
Cherokee Nation (1794–1907)
Indian Territory in the American Civil War
Arkansas in the American Civil War
Bleeding Kansas
Native Americans in the American Civil War
Irregular forces of the American Civil War